Fulk IV (in French Foulques IV) (1043 – 14 April 1109), called le Réchin, was the Count of Anjou from 1068 until his death. The nickname by which he is usually referred has no certain translation. Philologists have made numerous very different suggestions, including "quarreler", "rude", "sullen", "surly" and "heroic". He was noted to be "a man with many reprehensible, even scandalous, habits" by Orderic Vitalis.

Early life
Fulk, born 1043, was the younger son of Geoffrey II, Count of Gâtinais (sometimes known as Aubri), and Ermengarde of Anjou. Ermengarde was a daughter of Fulk the Black, count of Anjou, and the sister of Geoffrey Martel who preceded Fulk and his brother Geoffrey as Count of Anjou.

Count of Anjou
When Geoffrey Martel died without direct heirs he left Anjou to his nephew Geoffrey III of Anjou, Fulk's older brother. Fulk fought with his brother, whose rule was deemed incompetent, and captured him in 1067. Under pressure from the Church he released Geoffrey. The two brothers soon fell to fighting again, and the next year Geoffrey was again imprisoned by Fulk, this time for good. Substantial territory was lost to Angevin control due to the difficulties resulting from Geoffrey's poor rule and the subsequent civil war. Saintonge was lost, and Fulk had to give the Gâtinais to Philip I of France to placate the king. Much of Fulk's rule was devoted to regaining control over the Angevin baronage, and to a complex struggle with Normandy for influence in Maine and Brittany.

Before 1106, Fulk made a major gift to the Fontevraud Abbey.

Author of the History of Anjou
In 1096 Fulk wrote an incomplete history of Anjou and its rulers titled Fragmentum historiae Andegavensis or "History of Anjou". The authorship and authenticity of this work are disputed.  Only the first part of the history, describing Fulk's ancestry, is extant.  The second part, supposedly describing Fulk's own rule, has not been recovered.  If he did write it, it is one of the first medieval works of history written by a layman.

Death and succession

Fulk died on 14 April 1109 leaving the restoration of the countship, as it was under Geoffrey Martel, to his successors.

Family
Fulk may have married as many as five times; there is some doubt regarding the exact number or how many he repudiated.

His first wife was Hildegarde of Beaugency. Together they had a daughter:
 Ermengarde, who married to Alan IV, Duke of Brittany.

After her death, before or by 1070, he married Ermengarde de Bourbon. Together they had a son before Fulk repudiated her in 1075, possibly on grounds of consanguinity:
 Geoffrey IV Martel, ruled jointly with him for some time, but died in 1106.

Around 1076 he married Orengarde de Châtaillon. He repudiated her in 1080, possibly on grounds of consanguinity.

He then married an unnamed daughter of Walter I of Brienne by 1080. This marriage also ended in divorce, in 1087.

Lastly, in 1089, he married Bertrade de Montfort, who was apparently "abducted" by King Philip I of France in or around 1092. They had: 
 Fulk V "the Young", Count of Anjou and King of Jerusalem.

Notes

References

Sources

Counts of Anjou
1043 births
1109 deaths